Warhammer 40,000: Kill Team is a top-down shooter game with twin-stick control, set in the Warhammer 40,000 future fantasy universe. Players play as Space Marines attempting to halt an Ork invasion spaceship, facing orks and, later, Tyranids. Four Space Marine classes are playable Sternguard Veteran, Techmarine, Vanguard Veteran and Librarian. The first two focusing on Shooting the later two on melee. The game supports single player and same screen multiplayer modes.

The game included a bonus weapon for the use in multiplayer mode in the Warhammer 40,000: Space Marine, obtained by completing a level.

The game was developed and released by THQ for the Xbox 360 in July 2011 and for the PlayStation 3 in August 2011. A Microsoft Windows port was developed by UK based company D3T Ltd and released in May 2014.

Reception 

Warhammer 40,000: Kill Team received "mixed or average" reviews, according to review aggregator Metacritic.

Jim Sterling of Destructoid called Kill Team a "decent little shooter for fans of the franchise", and noted that the game was not designed for single-player mode, while criticizing the lack of online multiplayer. GameSpot's Carolyn Petit praised the title's mindless fun and compelling environment while taking issue with the shallow gameplay, local-only co-op, cheap deaths, and poor checkpoint placement. Nathan Grayson of GamesRadar liked the game's quick, violent twin-stick combat, unique classes, and customization but disliked the repetitive gameplay, short runtime, and pace-breaking tutorialization. Arthur Gies of IGN gave the game a 6.5 out of 10 and wrote, "Arcade shooters shouldn't be boring, and they shouldn't be needy and pushy, and Kill Team is often all of the above."

References

External links
Video game
Warhammer 40,000: Kill Team at MobyGames
Tabletop game
Official board game website
Warhammer 40,000: Kill Team at BoardGameGeek

2011 video games
Multidirectional shooters
PlayStation 3 games
PlayStation Network games
THQ games
Top-down video games
Video games developed in the United Kingdom
Kill Team
Windows games
Xbox 360 games
Xbox 360 Live Arcade games